Milnesium almatyense is a species of Eutardigrades in the family Milnesiidae. This species differs from its cogenerate species mainly by proportions of its claws and buccopharyngeal apparatus.

References

Apochela
Animals described in 2006